Parallel Universe Blues is the sixth studio album by American band Papercuts. It was released in October 2018 under Slumberland Records.

Accolades

Track listing

References

2018 albums
Papercuts (band) albums
Slumberland Records albums